"" is the national anthem of Lesotho. The lyrics were written by French missionary François Coillard and Swiss missionary Adolphe Mabille, and the music is taken from an 1820 hymnal composed by Swiss composer Ferdinand-Samuel Laur. It was officially adopted as the national anthem in 1967. The original composition that the national anthem was based on had five verses, though only the first and last ended up being adopted.

History
The song was written by French missionaries François Coillard and Adolphe Mabille and set to the tune of the 1820 hymnal "Freiheit" by Swiss composer Ferdinand-Samuel Laur. It was introduced around 1869 as part of a collection of hymns and work songs. This was immediately after the third and final Free State–Basotho War (1867–1868), and the lyrics encouraged the Basotho to accept the borders defined in the 1869 Convention of Aliwal North between Britain and the Boer Free State, which ended the war.

The song is first known to have been performed at a party work party for Basotho chief Molapo in 1870. Originally sung by field workers, by the 1900s, mission schools run by the Paris Evangelical Mission Society had begun teaching the song to their students. Over time, the song became abbreviated, and only the first and fifth (last) verses began to be taught. The missionaries also organised public performances of the song by their students on special occasions.

The song gained de facto use in important functions in the early 20th century, commonly being sung after "God Save the Queen", and was already being referred to as the national anthem by the 1940s. A version including the first and last verses, shortened by choral composer Joshua Pulumo Mohapeloa, was declared the official anthem of Lesotho on 1 June 1967, just over a year after independence on 4 October 1966.

Lyrics

Current lyrics

Original lyrics

Notes

References

External links
Lesotho: Lesotho Fatse La Bontata Rona - Audio of the national anthem of Lesotho, with information and lyrics (archive link)
National anthem of Lesotho MIDI
 - Vocal

Lesotho music
National symbols of Lesotho
African anthems
1966 songs
National anthem compositions in B-flat major